Stephen Goodhue Wheatland (August 11, 1824 – March 2, 1892) was a Massachusetts lawyer and politician who served as a member of the Massachusetts House of Representatives, as a member, and President of the Common Council; and the Mayor of Salem, Massachusetts.

Wheatland attended Harvard where he was a member and librarian of the Porcellian Club, and a member of the Hasty Pudding Club.

References

Footnotes

1824 births
1892 deaths
Massachusetts city council members
Mayors of Salem, Massachusetts
Members of the Massachusetts House of Representatives
Harvard University alumni
19th-century American politicians